A by-election for the Islamic Consultative Assembly's constituency Tehran, Rey, Shemiranat and Eslamshahr was held on 8 June 2001, to fill the vacancy caused by resignation of Akbar Hashemi Rafsanjani after he had won in the election held the previous year. The voters in Tehran cast their ballots along with the 2001 Iranian presidential election.

Alireza Mahjoub of the Worker House won the election.

Results 
The top nine candidates who ran for the seats, were:

References 

Parliamentary elections in Tehran
By-elections in Iran
2001 elections in Iran